The Buru flowerpecker (Dicaeum erythrothorax) is a species of bird in the family Dicaeidae. It is endemic to the Maluku Islands in Indonesia. Its natural habitats are subtropical or tropical moist lowland forest and subtropical or tropical moist montane forest.  It is restricted to Buru.

The Halmahera flowerpecker was until recently considered a subspecies.

References

Buru flowerpecker
Birds of Buru
Buru flowerpecker
Taxonomy articles created by Polbot